Altstetten may refer to:

Altstetten, Erdweg, Bavaria, Germany
Altstetten, Rennertshofen, Bavaria, Germany
Altstetten (Zürich), Canton of Zürich, Switzerland